Karutia is an extinct genus of parareptile known from the Early Permian Pedra de Fogo Formation of Brazil. The type species is Karutia fortunata.

References 

Procolophonomorphs
Prehistoric reptile genera
Fossil taxa described in 2021